The Best Disco Album in the World is a European compilation album released by WEA Records in 1979 comprising many recent disco-orientated hits. In the UK, the album was released in June and charted the following month, reaching No.1 in the albums chart for six consecutive weeks. It was the longest-running No.1 album of the year and was certified platinum by the BPI. In other parts of Europe, the track listing was altered.

UK Track listing 
Side one
 "Le Freak" - Chic (Edwards, Rodgers)
 "Knock On Wood" - Amii Stewart (Floyd, Cropper)
 "One Way Ticket" - Eruption (Hunter, Keller)
 "Painter Man" - Boney M (Phillips, Pickett)
 "I'm Every Woman" - Chaka Khan (Ashford, Simpson)
 "One Nation Under a Groove" - Funkadelic (Shider, Clinton, Morrison)
 "He's the Greatest Dancer" - Sister Sledge (Edwards, Rodgers)
 "Love Don't Live Here Anymore" - Rose Royce (Gregory)
Side two
 "We Are Family" - Sister Sledge (Edwards, Rodgers)
 "I Want Your Love" - Chic (Edwards. Rodgers)
 "I Can't Stand the Rain" - Eruption (Peebles, Miller, Bryant)
 "Fire" - The Pointer Sisters (Springsteen)
 "Wishing On a Star" - Rose Royce (Calvin)
 "Young Hearts Run Free" - Candi Staton (Crawford)
 "Weekend" - Mick Jackson (Jackson, Mayer)
 "You Really Touched My Heart" - Amii Stewart (Leng, May) 
 "Hooray! Hooray! It's a Holi-Holiday" - Boney M (Farian, Jay)

References 

Warner Music Group compilation albums
1979 compilation albums